The  Dallas Vigilantes season was the second season for the franchise in the Arena Football League. The team was coached by Clint Dolezel and played their home games at the American Airlines Center. The Vigilantes finished the regular season 11–7, qualifying for the playoffs for the first time in franchise history. As the 3rd seed in the National Conference, they lost to the Chicago Rush in the conference semifinals, 51–54.

Final roster

Standings

Schedule

Regular season
The Vigilantes began the season at home against the Kansas City Command on March 12. Their final game of the regular season was on July 23, when they hosted the Arizona Rattlers.

Playoffs

Regular season

Week 1: vs. Kansas City Command

Week 2: vs. Tulsa Talons

Week 3: BYE

Week 4: at Utah Blaze

Week 5: at Georgia Force

Week 6: vs. Milwaukee Mustangs

Week 7: at Tampa Bay Storm

Week 8: at Kansas City Command

Week 9: vs. Iowa Barnstormers

Week 10: at Spokane Shock

Week 11: at Chicago Rush

Week 12: vs. Pittsburgh Power

Week 13: vs. San Jose SaberCats

Week 14: BYE

Week 15: at Iowa Barnstormers

Week 16: at Tulsa Talons

Week 17: vs. Philadelphia Soul

Week 18: at Jacksonville Sharks

Week 19: vs. Chicago Rush

Week 20: vs. Arizona Rattlers

Playoffs

National Conference Semifinals: at (2) Chicago Rush

References

Dallas Vigilantes
Dallas Vigilantes seasons